V-type proton ATPase 116 kDa subunit a isoform 2 also known as V-ATPase 116 kDa isoform a2 is an enzyme that in humans is encoded by the ATP6V0A2 gene.

Function 

V-ATPase 116 kDa isoform a2 is a subunit of the vacuolar ATPase (v-ATPase), an heteromultimeric enzyme that is present in intracellular vesicles and in the plasma membrane of specialized cells, and which is essential for the acidification of diverse cellular components. V-ATPase consists of a membrane peripheral V(1) domain for ATP hydrolysis, and an integral membrane V(0) domain for proton translocation. The subunit encoded by this gene is a component of the V(0) domain.

Clinical significance 

Mutations in this gene are a cause of both cutis laxa type II and wrinkly skin syndrome.

References

Further reading

External links
  GeneReviews/NCBI/NIH/UW entry on ATP6V0A2-Related Autosomal Recessive Cutis Laxa
  OMIM entries on ATP6V0A2-Related Autosomal Recessive Cutis Laxa